Ge with stroke and hook (Ӻ ӻ; italics: Ӻ ӻ) is a letter of the Cyrillic script, formed from the Cyrillic letter Ge (Г г Г г) by adding a horizontal stroke and a hook. In Unicode this letter is called "Ghe with stroke and hook". It is similar in shape to the Latin letter F with hook (Ƒ ƒ) but is unrelated.

Ge with stroke and hook is only used in the Nivkh language, where it represents the voiced uvular fricative .

It can be replaced by the ge with stroke and descender, which has not yet been encoded in Unicode.

Computing codes

See also
Г г : Cyrillic Ge
Ғ ғ : Cyrillic Ghayn
Ƒ ƒ : Latin letter F with hook
Nivkh
Cyrillic characters in Unicode

References

Cyrillic letters with diacritics
Letters with stroke
Letters with hook